Ultraman is the name of several supervillains appearing in stories published by DC Comics. The characters are all evil or corrupted alternate-universe counterparts of Superman. Ultraman first appeared in Justice League of America #29 (August 1964).

Publication history
Ultraman first appeared as the evil counterpart of Superman on the original Earth-Three. Having created the worlds of Earth-One, containing Silver Age superheroes, as well as Earth-Two, containing the Golden Age ones, DC Comics decided to expand the universe to include various themed universes. The first of these was Earth-Three, in which there were villainous counterparts of DC's heroes as well as heroic counterparts of DC's villains. The first Ultraman was killed in Crisis on Infinite Earths and Earth-Three was destroyed by an anti-matter storm and then wiped from continuity at the end of the series. This original Earth-Three Ultraman has reappeared briefly both in the 1980s Animal Man series and the later Infinite Crisis mini-series.

Since Crisis on Infinite Earths, DC has returned to the concept of Ultraman, creating two different characters with that name, often appearing only for a single issue in a story arc. There have been several appearances by both characters. The first version was an anti-matter version of Ultraman, created for Grant Morrison's JLA: Earth 2 graphic novel. This version has appeared several times and was slain at the conclusion of the Final Crisis series. Another version, closer to the Silver Age original Ultraman, appeared on the New 52 universe's Earth-3. Based on comments by Grant Morrison, this Earth-3 universe is not the pre-Crisis Earth-Three, making this a new character unrelated to previous versions.

Fictional character biography

Original Earth-Three Ultraman
Unlike Superman, the Earth-Three Ultraman gets stronger every time he is exposed to kryptonite, originally developing a completely new superpower with each new exposure. In one such encounter, Ultraman acquired the ability to see through dimensional barriers, thus alerting the Crime Syndicate to the existence of alternate Earths in their first appearance. This allowed the Syndicate to attack the Justice League and Justice Society. Ultraman also differed from Superman, in that his version of the planet Krypton had not exploded. Where the Earth-Three dimension kryptonite originated was never specifically listed in any published book.

However, it is implied to be the same as ordinary kryptonite, as Ultraman got powers when exposed to Kryptonite from pre-Crisis Earth-One and Earth-Two, gaining fire vision from Barry Allen throwing some at him. Being exposed to a large chunk of it paralyzed him, as he acquired so many new superpowers that his body couldn't decide which one to use and he was therefore frozen in place. He does not appear to have been affected after this, so perhaps he can reject powers, or they wear off.

In the early 1980s, Ultraman teamed up with Lex Luthor of Earth-One, and Alexei Luthor of Earth-Two, in an unsuccessful attempt to eliminate the Supermen of both Earth-One and -Two (the Supermen were, in turn, assisted by the heroic Alexander Luthor of Earth-Three). Later, Ultraman joined the rest of the Crime Syndicate in a team-up with a time-traveling villain named Per Degaton, who had found their prison and released them. Degaton used them in his attempt to conquer Earth-Two, by stealing nuclear missiles from the Cuban Missile Crisis of Earth Prime, though they planned to betray him. This proved unsuccessful, as well, and he hurled them into the Future of Earth-1, having made sure this would happen if they touched him, and the events were wiped from the timeline afterwards. The original Ultraman was eliminated in the 1985 12-issue limited series, Crisis on Infinite Earths. Distraught at the fact that his superpowers were useless at the one time he actually needed them, he flew straight into the anti-matter cloud that was destroying Earth-Three, grimly informing Power Ring, "I do what I have done all my life. I fight... to the very end!".

After his death, the Pre-Crisis Ultraman showed up in the pages of Animal Man. There, he learned that he was seemingly a comic book character himself, who existed only for the entertainment of others. He also fought Overman, another pre-Crisis alternate universe version of Superman who had been infected by a sexually transmitted disease, became insane and killed, seemingly for the sake of killing. This Ultraman later faded into the mask of the Psycho-Pirate, who, for a time, was the only one who remembered the Pre-Crisis multiverse.

In One Year Later there are hints that a man controlling Kandor, under the name Kal-El, could be Ultraman. He has been using the help of a group of followers called the "Praisesingers" and the guidance of the "Holy Mother". Supergirl and Power Girl fight his efforts, causing his cult-like following to falter. This leader also slays several of his own people to keep political information quiet. It has now been revealed that this Kal-El is indeed Ultraman, who was saved from the Crisis and brainwashed by Saturn Queen, his "mother", one of the masterminds behind the "Absolute Power" arc in Superman/Batman. This version appears to be a much weaker version, as he receives a vicious beating from Supergirl not once, but twice.

An additional incarnation of the Pre-Crisis Earth-Three Ultraman has made appearances most recently in Infinite Crisis, where Alexander Luthor, Jr. wanted to create so-called "perfect beings" out of his models of long-dead father Alexander Luthor, Sr., the lone superhero of Earth-Three, Superman (both of Earth-One and Earth-Two), Wonder Woman (of Earth-One and Two) and the Earth-Three Ultraman and Superwoman.

During the Convergence storyline, Ultraman was with the Crime Syndicate when they planned to free Superwoman from death row. After they failed and the domes fell around the various cities, Ultraman engaged the Superman of the Justice Legion.

Clark Kent (Anti-Matter Ultraman)

In 1999, Ultraman was reintroduced in the JLA: Earth 2 graphic novel. The Crime Syndicate of America (CSA) is revealed for the first time to the Justice League by Alexander Luthor, the heroic antimatter counterpart to Lex Luthor. In this continuity, the CSA comes from the Antimatter Universe, each member being the antimatter counterpart to a core League member.

Unlike the original pre-Crisis Earth-Three Kryptonian Ultraman, the antimatter Ultraman was fully rewritten for modern continuity as Lieutenant Clark Kent, a human astronaut from the antimatter Earth and no longer a Kryptonian matching Superman exactly. After his ship imploded into hyperspace, an unknown alien race reconstructed Kent in an attempt to repair the damaged astronaut, which ended up altering the human both mentally and physically, giving him ultrapowers similar to Superman's superpowers. According to Alexander Luthor, the process also twisted Ultraman's mind. In contrast to Superman, Ultraman's power relies on his proximity and exposure to a substance called Anti-Kryptonite; the longer and farther he is separated from it, the weaker he becomes. This substance has repeatedly been shown to have no apparent effect on Superman, just as Kryptonite has been shown to have no effect on Ultraman.

Antimatter Ultraman is unhappily married to his Crime Syndicate teammate Superwoman. Their alter-egos are the Antimatter Earth's alternate Clark Kent and Lois Lane. In the early 2000s, the two had a child together, but Superwoman maintains a periodic affair with another member of the Crime Syndicate, Owlman, much to Ultraman's frustration. Ultraman would usually fire his eyebeams in between Owlman and Superwoman as a warning when he sees Owlman flirting with Superwoman, although undisclosed photographic blackmail material in Owlman's possession stops Ultraman actually doing anything permanent to him.

Antimatter Clark Kent has been shown to have returned to the Antimatter Earth and again leads the antimatter Crime Syndicate. In an attempt to repair their Earth after the destruction done by the Weaponers of Qward (which resulted as part of the follow-up to their appearance in the first issue of JLA/Avengers), The Syndicate was shown to have been kidnapping people from all 52 matter universes as shown in the Trinity series. In Trinity #13, antimatter Ultraman, Owlman and Superwoman were banished to an alternate subdimension by Superman after Superman defeated Ultraman in a fight.

In Superman Beyond, the antimatter Ultraman was recruited on a journey to the DC Universe's version of Limbo, along with several other alternate universe Supermen, briefly combining - albeit against his will - with Superman to activate a massive robotic version of themselves to defeat Mandrakk, the dark Monitor, their raw power combining in the robot along with Superman's moral strength and Ultraman's pragmatic ruthlessness. In Superman Beyond #2, he was shown to have been converted into a vampiric being. In the seventh issue of Final Crisis, the antimatter Ultraman was apparently slain by the united Supermen alongside his new master, Mandrakk.

Post Crisis Earth-3 Ultraman
In 52 Week 52, a new version of Earth-Three was shown as one universe amongst the Post-Crisis DC Multiverse. In the depiction was the Crime Society of America, whose members were twisted versions of the original Justice Society of America, including Superman. The names of the characters and the team are not mentioned in the two panels in which they appear, but this Post-Crisis Earth-3 Ultraman was originally shown to be aged, as he was a counterpart of the aged Superman of Post-Crisis Earth-2. When the Earth-3 Ultraman is shown in later appearances of the Countdown series, he is no longer aged but young. The Earth-3 team is the Crime Society of America.

The Society make their first solo appearance in Countdown Presents The Search for Ray Palmer: Crime Society #1 (origin of Post Crisis Earth-3 Owlmen, Talons, Jokester, who is a heroic Joker) written by Sean McKeever and illustrated by Jamal Igle. In subsequent appearances, the Crime Society are agents of Monarch's Multiversal army. Ultraman, along with several other members of the Crime Society, were in the Earth-51 dimension when Superman-Prime destroyed the Monarch's containment armor unleashing all of Monarch's quantum energy which destroyed the entire Earth-51 dimension. As such, Ultraman is presumed dead along with his fellow Crime Society members.

The New 52
In The New 52 rebooted DC's continuity, a new version of Ultraman is introduced as one of the members of the Crime Syndicate to arrive from Earth-Three at the conclusion of the "Trinity War" event.

This version of Ultraman is Kal-Il, who comes from a version of Krypton whose people are mean-spirited and selfish. Unlike their other incarnations, they gain power when exposed to green Kryptonite. Just before this Krypton was destroyed, Kal-Il's parents Jor-Il and Lara sent him to Earth-3 to one day seek vengeance against the being that destroyed Krypton (whom Jor-Il inadvertently summoned), teaching him to become the strongest being on the planet, or become nothing at all. Upon his arrival on Earth-3, the young Kal-Il coerced two alcoholic drug addicts, Johnny and Martha Kent, to adopt him, only to murder them years later once he had no further need of them. He went on to found the Crime Syndicate and take over the world. Ultraman is a violent, homicidal megalomaniac, as well as an elitist and Darwinist who values strength and selfishness, and hates weakness and altruism. After Earth-3 was devastated by the same being that destroyed Krypton-3, Ultraman led the Crime Syndicate to the Prime Earth to conquer it.

This version of Ultraman possesses the standard powers of a Kryptonian, only he is empowered by green Kryptonite (being able to crush it into powder and even snort it like cocaine) and is weakened by yellow sunlight. He was responsible for murdering Monocle when he claimed that the Crime Syndicate was the Justice League in disguise. Ultraman moved the moon in front of the sun to eclipse the Crime Syndicate's section of Earth as well as to protect himself from its rays.

The "New 52" version of Ultraman is shown as incredibly strong (fights Black Adam and swiftly defeats him), and is fairly impervious to "Shazam magic", which, in pre-New 52 continuity, is one of mainstream Superman's weaknesses (possibly because Ultraman comes from an alternate universe and is unaffected by magic of a different universe). Also Outsider mentioned that Ultraman has killed many gods from Earth-3 In the final battle, Ultraman engages Alexander Luthor but is beaten, Alexander leaves him to steal Deathstorm's powers. Ultraman later returns and attempts to attack Lex Luthor after he murdered Alexander Luthor only to be weakened after Sinestro and Black Adam move the moon and expose him to yellow sunlight. Lex Luthor opts not to kill Ultraman and kills Atomica instead. In the aftermath of the battle, Ultraman and Superwoman are in the custody of the authorities. He is seen sobbing in his cell.

During the "Darkseid War" storyline, Ultraman is released and given Kryptonite in order to battle the former Anti-Monitor: Mobius. When he attacks Mobius by himself against Superman's advice, he find himself overpowered. Mobius then brutally kills Ultraman in cold blood.

During the "Year of the Villain" event, Earth 3 alongside the Crime Syndicate of America was revived. Ultraman was present when Perpetua as Ultraman becomes impressed with her bloodshed. After witnessing Johnny Quick get killed when he suspects that allying with her is a bad idea, Ultraman agrees to have his Crime Syndicate lead the people of Earth 3 in her army where the people of Earth 3 were turned into Apex Predators.

During the "Dark Nights: Death Metal" storyline following Perpetua's conquest of the Multiverse, Ultraman and Superwoman fight Green Lantern, Superman of Earth 23, and Wonder Woman of Earth 6 when they target Perpetua's tuning fork that is powering her Anti-Crisis Energy. Wary about what Perpetua would do to Earth 3, Owlman uses a gun made on Qward to kill Ultraman and Superwoman. Using a Black Lantern ring, Batman was able to revive Ultraman and Johnny Quick to help fight the forces of the Darkest Knight.

Infinite Frontier
Following the reboot of the multiverse after Dark Nights: Death Metal, a new Earth-3 and Ultraman are created. Kal Il is the last survivor of the dead planet Krypton, sent to Earth as a baby. He was found by Jonathan and Martha Kent, who adopted him and named him Clark. His powers manifested early and he never bothered to hide them, so the other children were afraid of and ostracised him, telling him that he was from space. The Kents exploited Clark and his powers for free labour, teaching him that obedience was the ultimate virtue and that people who did not contribute to society were to be reviled as "freeloaders". They also manipulated him to be emotionally dependent on them so that he would never leave the farm. When he was a teenager in 1963 his parents showed him his spacecraft and revealed to him that he was the last of his kind, telling him they were all he had. They hoped this would make him afraid to ever break free of them, but in fact he turned on them, realising that they had only ever taken advantage of him. He flew away from Smallville, carrying his ship.

Ultraman revealed himself to the world on November 22, 1963 by assassinating the hated President John F. Kennedy with his heat vision. He was his world's only known metahuman until other beings with unnatural powers began to emerge at the start of the year 2021. He rules over Metropolis as a semi-benevolent dictator, beloved by some but feared and hated by many others. Ultraman allows the people of Metropolis some limited freedoms but tolerates no dissent, the only people who dare to challenge him openly are the editrix of the Daily Planet Cat Grant and Alexander Luthor.

Following the Starro invasion, a number of metahumans revealed themselves to the world and Luthor began recruiting them into his Legion of Justice. Owlman and Superwoman approached Ultraman for an alliance to counter Luthor and rule the world, offering to make him their leader. Ultraman accepts and Superwoman also offers herself to him, hoping to conceive an heir.

Powers and abilities
Ultraman possesses, essentially, the same Kryptonian superpowers as Superman, albeit most portrayals show him gaining powers from exposure to Kryptonite, even snorting it like a drug in the New 52 series; contrasting Superman, who is empowered by yellow sunlight. Ultraman is also weakened by yellow sunlight in the New 52 comics as his parents state that direct sunlight from Earth's sun breaks down the Kryptonite radiation in the cells of Earth-Three Kryptonians, stripping them of their powers and causing physical weakness and possibly emotional distress as well. A few portrayals have shown Ultraman being empowered by "Anti-Kryptonite", but not weakened by Kryptonite from the mainstream universe or yellow sunlight as in the New 52.

In the animated movie Justice League: Crisis on Two Earths, Ultraman is weakened by blue Kryptonite that came from his earth and alternate earths though it is never explicitly stated what produces his abilities. Smallvilles Ultraman was shown to be vulnerable to Kryptonite (from both Earths) and strengthened by yellow sunlight like Earth-One Superman. The Anti-Matter Ultraman was a human empowered by Anti-Kryptonite and required it on his person to maintain his powers while regular Kryptonite did not affect him.

There is a difference in the names of some of his abilities (super strength is called ultra strength, super vision is called ultra vision, super speed is called ultra speed, super hearing is called ultra hearing, etc.). His other powers are flight, heat vision (which he often uses to intimidate or murder people), x-ray vision, and invulnerability.

Superman noted during a fight with Ultraman that Ultraman constantly murdering his opponents in their first confrontations actually made him weaker than Superman, as he simply eliminated his enemies upon encountering them as they were still getting used to their powers, while Superman fought them as they continued to get stronger and thus had to improve himself, putting Ultraman at a disadvantage when facing Superman's ability to think tactically, although this confrontation occurred when Superman was subject to a complex spell that was causing him to 'merge' with Batman and Wonder Woman, allowing him to draw on their superior tactical expertise. Also the first comic book portrayal showed Ultraman being defeated when over-exposed to kryptonite as he gained too much power for his body to handle; this is similar to what caused Superman a slow death in All-Star Superman when he flew too close to the sun and gained more power than his body could handle.

Other versions
Earth-43
As well as Earth-3, there is also a further New 52 iteration of Ultraman (as opposed to Superman) on vampire-dominated Earth-43, who is a member of the ex-metahuman vampiric "Blood League", which also includes vampire analogues of Batman, Robin, Cyborg, Green Lantern and Wonder Woman, as well as supervillains such as the Joker and Doctor Sivana. It is possible that this iteration of Ultraman may share Superman's vulnerability to magic, which is presumably how Ultraman was infected on that alternate Earth.

In other media
Television
 A variation of Ultraman named Kal-Ul appears in The World's Greatest Super Friends episode "Universe of Evil", voiced by Danny Dark. Similarly to the comics and Kal-El / Superman, Kal-Ul hails from Earth-Three and was sent from Krypton to Earth, during which he was empowered by Kryptonite. Upon his arrival on Earth, he developed new powers across other encounters with Kryptonite until he reached adulthood, renamed himself "Ultraman", began a life of destruction, and eventually founded the Crime Syndicate of America.
 A variation of Ultraman named Clark Luthor appears in season ten of Smallville, portrayed by Tom Welling. This version hails from Earth-Two, where the toddler Kal-El was discovered and raised by Lionel Luthor instead of Jonathan and Martha Kent and went on to become the murderous Ultraman. Additionally, Ultraman bears an "L"-shaped scar on his right arm after his foster brother, Lex Luthor, attacked him with Gold Kryptonite. In the episode "Luthor", he travels to Earth-One after its Clark Kent activates a Mirror Box and inadvertently causes him and Ultraman to swap universes. Free of Lionel's influence, Ultraman enjoys living in Earth-One until Clark Kent activates an Earth-Two Mirror Box to undo the swap. In the episode "Kent", Ultraman goes on the run after killing his universe's Oliver Queen, who exposed the former's secret identity and vulnerability to green Kryptonite to the world. After using his Mirror Box to swap places with Clark Kent once more, Ultraman attempts to find the Earth-One Lionel until Clark Kent returns and defeats him. Upon his return to Earth-Two, Ultraman is greeted by his version of Jor-El.

Another version of Ultraman appears in Superman and Lois. He is an evil doppelgänger of Superman from John Henry Irons Earth. The relationship between the two is reminiscent of Ultraman and Alexander Luthor Senior of Earth 3.

Film
Ultraman appears in Justice League: Crisis on Two Earths, voiced by Brian Bloom as the leader of the Crime Syndicate. Known as the "Boss of Bosses", Ultraman is vulnerable to Blue Kryptonite and enjoys tormenting President Slade Wilson and the First Daughter, Rose, after he murdered the First Lady, Adeline Wilson. After being defeated by the Justice League and betrayed by Owlman, Ultraman and the Crime Syndicate are arrested by Marines led by President Wilson.

Video games
 Ultraman appears as a playable character in Lego DC Super-Villains, voiced by Nolan North. After the Justice League go missing, he and the Crime Syndicate pose as the Justice Syndicate, with Ultraman also adopting the alias of Kent Clarkson''', Clark Kent's replacement at the Daily Planet.
 Ultraman appears as a boss in DC Universe Online'' as part of the "Earth-3" DLC.

See also
List of Superman enemies

References

External links
 Supermanica: Ultraman of Earth-3 Supermanica entry on the Pre-Crisis Ultraman

Alternative versions of Superman
DC Comics characters who can move at superhuman speeds
DC Comics characters with accelerated healing
DC Comics characters with superhuman senses
DC Comics characters with superhuman strength
DC Comics supervillains
DC Comics male supervillains
DC Comics extraterrestrial supervillains
Fictional astronauts
Fictional characters from parallel universes
Fictional dictators
Fictional characters with slowed ageing
Fictional characters with X-ray vision
Fictional characters with air or wind abilities
Fictional characters with ice or cold abilities
Fictional characters with energy-manipulation abilities
Fictional characters with fire or heat abilities
Fictional characters with absorption or parasitic abilities
Kryptonians
Fictional mass murderers
Comics characters introduced in 1964
Characters created by Gardner Fox
Characters created by Mike Sekowsky
Video game bosses
Superman characters